Lou Barin  (born 26 January 1999) is a French freestyle skier who competes internationally.
 
She participated at the 2018 Winter Olympics.

References

External links

1999 births
Living people
French female freestyle skiers 
Olympic freestyle skiers of France 
Freestyle skiers at the 2018 Winter Olympics 
Freestyle skiers at the 2016 Winter Youth Olympics
Universiade bronze medalists for France
Universiade medalists in freestyle skiing
Competitors at the 2019 Winter Universiade
Université Savoie-Mont Blanc alumni